Pierre Guitton (16 March 1944 – 20 July 2021) was a French painter and comic book author and artist. He notably designed the pages of Charlie Mensuel and Hara-Kiri.

Biography
In 1969, he began his career at Charlie Mensuel. In 1971, he founded the magazine Zinc alongside , where they published underground comic strip reviews. The magazine folded in 1974.

From 1975 to 1987, Guitton published his designs and comic strips in Charlie Mensuel Hara-Kiri, À Suivre, and Zero. In 1987, he ceased collaboration with all magazines and devoted himself to painting. He became a well-known painter throughout Indre-et-Loir, participating in multiple artistic exhibitions and cultural manifestations.

In 2011, a retrospective titled Pierre Guitton rétrospective : Et c'est pas fini ! was published. It highlighted his designs published in Charlie Mensuel and Zinc. In 2018, another retrospective titled Contes du Lapin jaune covered his publications in À Suivre from 1985 to 1987.

Pierre Guitton died on 20 July 2021 at the age of 77.

Publications
Tout doit disparaître (1978)
Et c’est pas fini !  : rétrospective Pierre Guitton (2011)
Les contes de Lapin Jaune (2018)

References

1944 births
2021 deaths
People from Loches
20th-century French painters
French artists
21st-century French painters